The American Legion Memorial Building, also known as Atlantic National Guard Armory, at 201 Poplar Street in Atlantic, Iowa was built in 1939.  It was listed on the National Register of Historic Places in 2006.  Designed by Council Bluffs architect George A. Spooner, it includes Moderne and Art Deco architecture.  It was built by G.F. Construction Company of Exira, Iowa.  The building served historically for arms storage, as a military facility, as a meeting hall, and as a sport facility.

References

Buildings and structures completed in 1939
Atlantic, Iowa
American Legion buildings
Military facilities on the National Register of Historic Places in Iowa
Buildings and structures in Cass County, Iowa
National Register of Historic Places in Cass County, Iowa
Clubhouses on the National Register of Historic Places in Iowa